= Kampung Tanjung Kubong =

Tanjung Kubong Village Kampung Tanjung Kubong
- Country: Malaysia
- Federal territory: Labuan

Kampung Tanjung Kubong is a village in Federal Territory of Labuan, Malaysia.
